Esperantology, or Esperanto studies, is a special Esperanto linguistics whose subjects are word construction, word assembly, word introduction and transcription of umbrella terms and proper names. Esperantology principles of word construction are exemplary of the principles of necessity and sufficiency which postulate a balance between conciseness and clarity of the word. Regarding word roots, esperantology sets these principles:

 The principle of internationality
 The principle of analogy with other language elements
 The principle of the vocabulary being economical
 The principle of euphony

As it is possible to see, all these principles are not always in accordance among themselves; for example the principle of internationality asks for the word internacionala while the analogy and the dictionary being economical as for the word internacia. In the language, the second and third rule are stronger than the first one.

Besides, the absolute validity of the above-mentioned principles also obstructs the language use, which can sanction not that correct forms and can clarify forms not clear enough.

Literature
 Wüster: Esperantologiaj principoj (E-Germana Vortaro). Neergard: Fremdvortoj en E. Tie oni trovas ankaŭ bibliografian liston. KALOCSAY.
 Welger: Germanlingva studo pri la starigo, prioritatigo kaj interagado de planlingvaj kvalitokriterioj en la verkaro de Zamenhof

References

See also
 Interlinguistics
 Esperantic Studies Foundation
 Centre for Research and Documentation on World Language Problems

Esperanto
Interlinguistics